Dulsberg is a quarter of Hamburg, Germany, in the borough of Hamburg-Nord. In the east and the south it borders Wandsbek.

History 
1906: the station "Friedrichsberg" was opened by Hamburg S-Bahn
1910: the second great fire of Hamburg
Up to 1951 Dulsberg hill was part of Barmbek

Politics
These are the results of Dulsberg in the Hamburg state election:

Architecture 
The Dulsberg quarter was planned by the City of Hamburg's Director of Constructions, Fritz Schumacher in the 1920s. After World War II, the buildings were reconstructed using the original outer walls.

Public Transport 

"Friedrichsberg" S-Bahn (Suburban Commuter Railway) station in Hamburg-Dulsberg. This station was originally opened in 1906.

The underground railway was extended in 1962/63 from "Wandsbek-Markt" to "Wandsbek-Gartenstadt" meeting the stations "Alter Teichweg" and "Straßburger Straße" in the neighbourhood.

References

External links

Quarters of Hamburg
Hamburg-Nord